The Umm Shaif Oil Field is an oil field in Abu Dhabi. It was discovered in 1958 and developed by Abu Dhabi Marine Areas Ltd, a joint venture between British Petroleum and Compagnie Française des Pétroles (CFP—later Total). The oil field is now operated and owned by Abu Dhabi National Oil Company.

References 

Oil fields of the United Arab Emirates